Navitoclax (previously ABT-263) is an experimental orally active anti-cancer drug, which is a Bcl-2 inhibitor similar in action to obatoclax.

Mechanism of action 

Navitoclax inhibits not only Bcl-2, but also Bcl-XL and Bcl-w proteins. Because navitoclax inhibits Bcl-XL, it reduces platelet lifespan, causing thrombocytopenia, and this makes it dose-limiting.

Effects against senescent cells 
In animal studies, navitoclax was found to be a senolytic agent, inducing apoptosis in senescent, but not non-senescent cells. Oral administration of ABT263 to either sublethally irradiated or normally aged mice reduced senescent cells, including senescent bone marrow hematopoietic stem cells and senescent muscle stem cells. This depletion mitigated total-body irradiation-induced premature aging of the hematopoietic system and rejuvenated the aged hematopoietic stem cells and muscle stem cells in normally aged mice.

On September 19, 2018, an article was published in Nature about using this drug to kill senescent glial cells in mice.  The drug had a protective effect against memory loss in mice genetically engineered to simulate Alzheimer's Disease.

Clinical trials
ABT-263 was studied in 2009.
In January 2017, Navitoclax was evaluated as a combination treatment against solid tumors together with trametinib in a clinical trial sponsored by the National Cancer Institute.

Antisclerotic
Not directly related to cancer, rather as a therapy for scleroderma, Navitoclax appeared to reduce existing fibrosis through inducing apoptosis of myofibroblasts.  Further research is required to elucidate the exact mechanisms and confirm studies.

References 

Experimental cancer drugs
Trifluoromethyl compounds
Sulfonamides
4-Morpholinyl compunds
Chloroarenes
Phenylpiperazines
Cyclohexenes